2011 Italian Athletics Indoor Championships was the 42nd edition of the Italian Athletics Indoor Championships and were held in Ancona.

Champions

Men

Women

See also
2011 Italian Athletics Championships

References

External links
 FIDAL web site

Italian Athletics Championships
Athletics
Italian Athletics Indoor Championships
February 2011 sports events in Italy